The 1977 Swedish speedway season was the 1977 season of motorcycle speedway in Sweden.

Individual

Individual Championship
The 1977 Swedish Individual Speedway Championship final was held on 19 August in Kumla. Bernt Persson won the Swedish Championship.

Junior Championship
 
Winner - Peter Johansson

Team

Team Championship
Smederna won division 1 and were declared the winners of the Swedish Speedway Team Championship for the second time. The Smederna team included Bernt Persson and Bengt Jansson.

The league was expanded to five divisions for the first time, with three regional leagues in the third division.Skepparna won the second division, while Gamarna, Brassarna and Vikingarna won the third division regional leagues.

See also 
 Speedway in Sweden

References

Speedway leagues
Professional sports leagues in Sweden
Swedish
Seasons in Swedish speedway